Shannon City is a city in southern Union and northern Ringgold counties in the U.S. state of Iowa. The population was 73 at the time of the 2020 census.

Geography
Shannon City is two miles west of US Route 169 along the Union-Ringgold County line. The Grand River flows past the southeast side of the community.

Demographics

2010 census
As of the census of 2010, there were 71 people, 35 households, and 19 families living in the city. The racial makeup of the city was 98.6% White and 1.4% from two or more races. Hispanic or Latino of any race were 1.4% of the population.

There were 35 households, of which 22.9% had children under the age of 18 living with them, 31.4% were married couples living together, 5.7% had a female householder with no husband present, 17.1% had a male householder with no wife present, and 45.7% were non-families. 40.0% of all households were made up of individuals, and 20% had someone living alone who was 65 years of age or older. The average household size was 2.03 and the average family size was 2.58.

The median age in the city was 44.3 years. 22.5% of residents were under the age of 18; 2.8% were between the ages of 18 and 24; 26.7% were from 25 to 44; 29.6% were from 45 to 64; and 18.3% were 65 years of age or older. The gender makeup of the city was 59.2% male and 40.8% female.

2000 census
As of the census of 2000, there were 70 people, 34 households, and 19 families living in the city. The racial makeup of the city was 97.14% White, 1.43% from other races, and 1.43% from two or more races.

There were 34 households, out of which 26.5% had children under the age of 18 living with them, 38.2% were married couples living together, 5.9% had a female householder with no husband present, and 44.1% were non-families. 38.2% of all households were made up of individuals, and 17.6% had someone living alone who was 65 years of age or older. The average household size was 2.06 and the average family size was 2.63.

In the city, the population was spread out, with 21.4% under the age of 18, 5.7% from 18 to 24, 34.3% from 25 to 44, 22.9% from 45 to 64, and 15.7% who were 65 years of age or older. The median age was 40 years. For every 100 females, there were 112.1 males. For every 100 females age 18 and over, there were 120.0 males.

The median income for a household in the city was $19,583, and the median income for a family was $23,750. Males had a median income of $19,063 versus $16,667 for females. The per capita income for the city was $10,554. There were 20.0% of families and 17.7% of the population living below the poverty line, including 12.0% of under eighteens and none of those over 64.

References

Cities in Iowa
Cities in Union County, Iowa
Cities in Ringgold County, Iowa